Jonathan C. Wright is an American politician who currently serves as a judge in Illinois's 11th Circuit. A member of the Republican Party, he served a partial term in the Illinois House of Representatives from June 21, 2001, until January 8, 2003, and served as the State's Attorney for Logan County, Illinois from December 3, 2012, to December 7, 2018.

Early life
Wright was born October 11, 1966, in Winfield, Illinois and raised in the neighboring village of Carol Stream. He graduated from Monmouth College with a Bachelor of Arts and later from Chicago-Kent College of Law with a Juris Doctor. Upon receiving a position with the Illinois Attorney General he moved to Lincoln, Illinois. He met his wife Melanie with whom he has five children. Sometime prior to 2001, he went into private practice, which included serving as the city attorney for Atlanta, Illinois.

Illinois House of Representatives
He was appointed to succeed Representative John Turner who was appointed to a judgeship on the Illinois 4th District Appellate Court. Soon after his appointment, in the decennial redistricting process, Wright was drawn into the same district as longtime Republican Gwenn Klingler of Springfield. Wright chose not to run for reelection. Klinger, a moderate, was defeated by conservative Rich Brauer of Petersburg in that cycle's Republican primary.

His committee assignments included; Agriculture; Judiciary I-Civil Law; Judiciary II-Criminal Law; and Labor. He served on the Special Committee for Prosecutorial Misconduct and was the minority spokesman for the Special Committees on Tobacco Settlement Proceeds. Notably, he was the sponsor of a bill to allow student-led school prayer in public schools. The bill was criticized due to Wright's hope that the bill would lead students to convert to Christianity. The bill itself did nothing but reiterate the rights students already had under the First Amendment to the United States Constitution. After the end of his term, he joined the Office of the Logan County State's Attorney as an Assistant State's Attorney.

Campaigns for federal office

Wright became a candidate in the 2004 Republican primary for the U.S. Senate seat being vacated by Peter Fitzgerald. He ran on a conservative platform of opposition to same-sex marriage and support for the criminalization of abortion. He was the only candidate from either major party not from northern region of the state. In a year notable for a record number of millionaire candidates, Wright had to keep his day job during the primary campaign. A perpetual longshot throughout the campaign, he finished fifth of eight candidates, receiving 17,189 (2.3%) of 661,804 votes cast.

In 2006, he briefly explored a campaign for Congress in Illinois's 18th congressional district before dropping out in favor of incumbent Ray LaHood.

State’s Attorney
In 2012, Wright was elected Logan County State's Attorney, succeeding fellow Republican Michael McIntosh. He was sworn in on December 3, 2012. He was elected to a second term in 2016. Brad Hague, an Assistant State's Attorney, was appointed by the Logan County Board to succeed Wright as State's Attorney.

Judge
In 2018, Wright was appointed by the Illinois Supreme Court to succeed Thomas Harris after Harris was elected to the appellette court. Wright's term as a judge began January 7, 2019. Wright will seek election to the Eleventh Circuit which covers McLean, Ford, Livingston, Logan, Woodford in the 2020 general election.

References

1966 births
Living people
People from Carol Stream, Illinois
People from Lincoln, Illinois
People from Winfield, Illinois
Monmouth College alumni
Chicago-Kent College of Law alumni
Illinois lawyers
Republican Party members of the Illinois House of Representatives
21st-century American politicians